The Iphigénie class was a group of nine 32-gun/12-pounder frigates of the French Navy, built during the late 1770s at Lorient (2 ships) and Saint Malo (7 ships). They were designed by Léon Guignace. The seven built at Saint Malo were initially numbered Nos. 1 – 7 respectively, and not given names until October 1777 (for Nos 1 – 4) and the start of 1778 (Nos. 5 – 7); all seven were captured by the British Navy between 1779 and the end of 1800. Of the two built at Lorient, the Spanish captured one, and a storm wrecked the other.

 Iphigénie  
Builder: Gilles Cambry at Lorient Dockyard
Ordered:
Laid down: February 1777
Launched: 16 October 1777
Completed: March 1778
Fate: Captured by the Spanish in February 1795, becoming Spanish Ifigenia.

 Surveillante  
Builder: Gilles Cambry at Lorient Dockyard
Ordered:
Laid down: August 1777
Launched: 26 March 1778
Completed: May 1778
Fate: Wrecked in a storm in Bantry Bay, January 1797

 Résolue (ex No.1)  
Builder: Saint Malo Dockyard
Ordered:
Laid down: July 1777
Launched: 16 March 1778
Completed: April 1778
Fate: Captured by the British 14 October 1798, becoming HMS Resolue.

 Gentille (ex No.2)  
Builder: Saint Malo Dockyard
Ordered:
Laid down: July 1777
Launched: 18 June 1778
Completed: August 1778
Fate: Captured by the British 11 April 1795, becoming HMS Gentille.

 Amazone (ex No.3)  
Builder: Saint Malo Dockyard
Ordered:
Laid down: August 1777
Launched: 11 May 1778
Completed: July 1778
Fate: Captured by the British 29 July 1782, but retaken by a French squadron the following day; wrecked off the Penmarch Islands January 1797.

 Prudente (ex No.4)  
Builder: Saint Malo Dockyard
Ordered:
Laid down: August 1777
Launched: late March 1778
Completed: July 1778
Fate: Captured by the British 2 June 1779, becoming HMS Prudente.

 Gloire (ex No.5)  
Builder: Saint Malo Dockyard
Ordered:
Laid down: January 1778
Launched: 9 July 1778
Completed: October 1778
Fate: Captured by the British 10 April 1795, becoming HMS Gloire.

 Bellone (ex No.6)  
Builder: Saint Malo Dockyard
Ordered:
Laid down: January 1778
Launched: 2 August 1778
Completed: February 1779
Fate: Captured by the British 12 October 1798, becoming HMS Proserpine.

 Médée (ex No.7)  
Builder: Saint Malo Dockyard
Ordered:
Laid down: January 1778
Launched: 23 September 1778
Completed: February 1779
Fate: Captured by the British 5 August 1800, becoming HMS Medee.

Sources and references 
 Notes

References

 Bibliography
 
  (1671-1870)

 
Frigate classes
Ship classes of the French Navy